Enola is I Can Make a Mess's fourth full-length studio album. The album was released through Rise Records. This is the first album in which the band has gone by the name I Can Make a Mess instead of the original I Can Make a Mess Like Nobody's Business.

Track listing
 "Enola" — 3:40
 "Wrinkle" — 3:40
 "Close Enough" — 3:35
 "Adaptation Cell" — 2:50
 "Listen Lesson / Keep Away" — 3:51
 "Tidal Wave" — 4:23
 "Lions" — 4:09
 "Ancient Crows" — 3:06
 "What Happens Now" — 3:26
 "Burn It All Down" — 3:35
 "Thin White Line" — 3:05

Music videos
A music video for the opening track, Enola, was released by Rise Records. It was shot and produced by el.de.te productions.

References

2013 albums
Ace Enders albums
I Can Make a Mess Like Nobody's Business albums
Rise Records albums